Tatte Bakery & Café is an American-Mediterranean gourmet fast-casual bakery and café founded by Israeli-born Tzurit Or. As of January 2023, Tatte has 30 locations, 22 in the Boston area and 8 in the metropolitan Washington, D.C. area.

History 
In 2007, Tzurit Or, a former film producer who immigrated from Israel to the United States in 2003, began baking family recipes in her kitchen to sell at the Copley Square Farmer's Market in Boston, Massachusetts. She baked for 20 hours a day to keep up with the demand. 

After just one summer at the farmer's market, she opened her first store, which she initially named Tatte Fine Cookies & Cakes, in nearby Boston suburb, Brookline, Massachusetts. Tatte's first brick and mortar location was a few blocks away from the Boston neighborhood of Back Bay. In the coming years, Or began expanding into the greater Boston area. In 2012, she expanded Tatte's presence into Kendall Square, a neighborhood of Cambridge, Massachusetts, opening three Tatte locations there in two years. The first Tatte location in Boston proper was its fifth store, which Or opened in 2015 on Beacon Hill's historic Charles Street. After opening a spacious Harvard Square location in 2016, Or began ramping up expansion in the Boston area. Tatte expanded into downtown Boston in 2019 with its Summer Street location, followed by a location at One Boston Place.

In August 2020, Tatte opened its first Washington, D.C. area location in D.C.'s West End neighborhood. It continued its expansion into Dupont Circle, then into D.C. suburbs Bethesda, Maryland and Arlington, Virginia.

Name 
Or's daughter inspired the business' name. Although Tatte – which rhymes with "latte" – means "daddy" in Yiddish, young Hebrew speakers often say "tatte" in place of the Hebrew word for grandmother, "savta." While Or was working on her farmer's market stand logo, her young daughter said "tatte" out loud when looking at a photo of her grandmother, which led Or to name her farmer's market stand "Tatte."

Current locations 

Tatte's 22 Boston area stores are located in Boston, Brookline, Cambridge, Newton, and Wellesley. Tatte also has locations on the campuses of three colleges in the city of Boston: Berklee College of Music, Emerson College, and Northeastern University.

Tatte's Washington, D.C. area stores include locations in West End, Dupont Circle, and Foggy Bottom, as well as Bethesda and Arlington. As of early 2023, Tatte has 8 locations in Washington, D.C. and nearby suburbs.

References 

Bakeries of the United States
Bakery cafés

Fast casual restaurants
Companies based in Boston
American companies established in 2007